Villanova Monferrato is a comune (municipality) in the Province of Alessandria in the Italian region Piedmont, located about  east of Turin and about  northwest of Alessandria and about  south of Vercelli. Located in the plain to the left of the Po, it the most northerly comune in the province, and borders on the comuni of  Caresana, Motta de' Conti, Rive, and Stroppiana in the Vercelli, as well as those of Balzola and Casale Monferrato in the Province of Alessandria.

Notable buildings include the 19th-century parish church of  Sant'Emiliano, the oratory of the confraternity of  San Michele, and the town hall which contains a painting by Pier Francesco Guala depicting the Virgin and Child and the saints Emilian and Bernardino of Siena.

See also
Montferrat

References

Cities and towns in Piedmont